Central is an unincorporated community in Elmore County, Alabama.

History
A post office was established as Central Institute from 1874 to 1890, and another post office was established with the name Central that remained in operation from 1890 to 1988.

References 

Unincorporated communities in Elmore County, Alabama
Unincorporated communities in Alabama